X Japan Singles ~Atlantic Years~ is a compilation album released by X Japan on December 25, 1997. It serves as a follow-up to 1993's X Singles and contains most, but not all, A and B-sides released by the band after changing its name from "X" to "X Japan". The album reached number 14 on the Oricon chart.

Track listing 
 "Tears"
 "Tears (Classical Version)"
 "Rusty Nail"
 "Longing ~Togireta Melody~"
 "Dahlia"
 "Tears (Live)"
 "Forever Love"
 "Crucify My Love"
 "Week End (Live)"
 "Scars"
 "White Poem (M.T.A. Mix)"

References 

X Japan compilation albums
1997 compilation albums